Barton Heights Cemeteries is a set of six contiguous historic African-American cemeteries located in Richmond, Virginia, though were originally part of Henrico County. The cemeteries are the Cedarwood, originally called Phoenix and established in 1815, Union Mechanics, Methodist, Sycamore, Ebenezer, and Sons and Daughters of Ham cemeteries.  The cemeteries were established between 1815 and circa 1879, and include hundreds of burials.

The cemeteries were listed on the National Register of Historic Places in 2002.

References

External links
 Richmond Cemeteries, Barton Heights Cemeteries
 

Cemeteries in Richmond, Virginia
African-American cemeteries in Virginia
African-American history in Richmond, Virginia
History of slavery in Virginia
National Register of Historic Places in Richmond, Virginia